Thazhvaram is a 1990 Indian Malayalam-language western thriller film directed by Bharathan and written by M. T. Vasudevan Nair. It stars Mohanlal, Salim Ghouse, Sumalatha, Anju and Sankaradi. It tells the story of Balan (Mohanlal), who's on the lookout for Raju (Salim Ghouse) for taking revenge for murdering his wife Raji (Anju). Bharathan also composed the only song featured in the film, the background score was provided by Johnson.

Set in the backdrop of a remote village across a valley in Palakkad, the film is made in the style of a Spaghetti Western film, and has achieved a cult status in Kerala since its release. it was both a critical and commercial success, with many critics praising Mohanlal’s performance. it is considered to be one of Mohanlal’s best performances in his career.

Plot

Balan is in search of Raju and the search takes him to a remote village in a valley. Balan reaches a house in the hills, where he is welcomed  wholeheartedly by both Nanu, the house owner, and Kochutty, his daughter. Balan realizes that Raju stays with them as Raghavan. Balan learns that Nanu has helped Raju to start farming and that Nanu intends to have his daughter marry Raju. Balan decides to wait for Raghavan / Raju.

Raju, on his arrival, smells his enemy. The film progresses in with the two having to pretend before Nanu and Kochutty that they are good friends. The film cuts to a flashback, where Raju and Balan are close friends. He, in greed for money, killed Balan's wife, Raji, on their wedding night and ran away with Balan's hard-earned money.

Balan is now back in search of Raju to avenge the death of his wife. Raju attacks Balan in one of the numerous encounters the duo had and almost kills Balan. Balan survives the attack to save Nanu and his daughter from Raghavan.

Cast
Mohanlal as Balan
Salim Ghouse as Raju / Raghavan
Sumalatha as Kochootti
Anju as Raji
Sankaradi as Nanu
Balan K. Nair as Kanarettan, Raji's father

Production
This is Bharathan's second film with M. T. Vasudevan Nair after Vaishali in 1988. This is the second collaboration of Mohanlal and Bharathan after Kattathe Killikudu. Bharathan and Sasi Menon and Gayathri Ashokan did the poster designs.

Soundtrack
The soundtrack of this film had only one song composed by Bharathan himself to the lines written by Kaithapram and rendered by K. J. Yesudas.

Reception
Upon release, the film, initially a slow starter, garnered widespread positive reviews and became a success both critically and commercially. The camera work of Venu is considered the highlight of the film. Thazhvaram had just a handful of characters and the plot was so well developed that it was a visual treat for the viewers. The fighting in the climax amidst violent vultures is considered one of the best climax scenes in Malayalam cinema. The film is considered a cult classic in Malayalam and the performance of Mohanlal is considered one of his best in his acting career by the critics.

Awards
The film won Filmfare Award for Best Film - Malayalam received by V.B.K. Menon

References

External links
 

1990s Malayalam-language films
1990s thriller films
1990s crime films
1990 drama films
1990 films
Films shot in Palakkad
Films scored by Bharathan
Films directed by Bharathan
Films with screenplays by M. T. Vasudevan Nair
Indian films about revenge